Directive 2012/18/EU or the Seveso-III Directive (full title: Directive 2012/18/EU of the European Parliament and of the Council of 4 July 2012 on the control of major-accident hazards involving dangerous substances, amending and subsequently repealing Council Directive 96/82/EC) is a European Union directive aimed at controlling major chemical accident hazards. Seveso-III is implemented in national legislation and is enforced by national chemical safety authorities.

The Seveso-III Directive aims at preventing such incidents and minimising their risks. All EU countries are obliged to adopt measures at national and company level to prevent major accidents and to ensure appropriate preparedness and response should such accidents nevertheless happen. Industrial plants in the European Union are covered by the provisions of the Directive if dangerous substances are or could be present in the ‘establishment’ in quantities exceeding the relevant thresholds mentioned in the Directive. More than 12 000 establishments in the EU are covered by the requirements. 

Seveso-III replaces the previous Seveso-I (Directive 82/501/EC) and Seveso-II (Directive 96/82/EC) Directives, updating the laws due to changes in chemical classification regulations, for example. Seveso-III gets its name from the Seveso disaster, which occurred in 1976 in Italy. Seveso-III establishes minimum quantity thresholds for reporting and safety permits. There are two lists: one names individual substances, and another designates hazard categories for those substances not named separately. Documents required based on hazard and quantity are notification, Major Accident Prevention Policy (MAPP) and Seveso Safety Report.

Establishments covered by Seveso-III 
Today there are more than 12 000 establishments in the EU are covered by the Seveso-III Directive.  

Establishments covered by Seveso are split into two categories: 

 Lower-tier: Dangerous substances are present above a certain threshold set out in Annex I of the Directive. 
 Upper-tier: Establishments with dangerous substances present in even greater quantities, requiring more stringent controls to prevent and minimise the consequences of major accidents.

The main sectors covered are power generation, supply and distribution (13% of establishments); fuel storage (10%); general chemicals manufacture (9%) and wholesale and retail (8%).

Obligations for operators of establishments and Member State authorities

Main obligations for operators of all establishments 

 Notify the competent authority about the inventory of dangerous substances, specifying the quantities, physical form and the hazardous properties of the dangerous substances present in the establishment 
 Draw-up a major accident prevention policy (MAPP) 
 Implement a MAPP by appropriate means and a Safety Management System 
 Provide information to the competent authorities to identify the risks for domino effects

Additional obligations for operators of Upper Tier establishments 

 Produce a safety report for upper-tier establishments 
 Produce internal emergency plans for upper tier establishments

Main obligations for Member State authorities 

 Producing external emergency plans for upper tier establishments (Article 12)
 Deploying land-use planning for the siting of establishments 
 Making relevant information publicly available 
 Ensuring that any necessary action is taken after an accident including emergency measures, actions to ensure that the operator takes any necessary remedial measures and informing the persons likely to the affected
 Reporting the number of establishments (both tiers) to the Commission
 Reporting accidents to the Commission
 Prohibiting the unlawful use or operation of establishments 
 Conducting inspections
 Member States may maintain or adopt stricter measures than those contained in the Seveso Directive.

Citizen's rights 

 The public needs to be consulted and involved in the decision making for specific individual projects
 Member State authorities need to make available information held
 Access to justice needs to be granted in case the above rights have been infringed 

Citizens who live in an area potentially affected by a major accident involving dangerous substances, the EU legislation requires that Citizens are involved in the decision making, even if the establishment concerned is located in a neighbouring EU country. 

Citizens will be consulted when: 

 new establishments are planned
 significant modifications are made to existing ones 
 new developments are planned around existing establishments 
 external emergency plans are drawn up for high risk establishments

Major accidents in establishments covered by the Seveso-III Directive 

 Lubrizol factory fire in Rouen in 2019
 Chemical Industries of Ethylene Oxide (IQOXE) Explosion in Tarragona Spain

External links 
Text of the directive

The Seveso Directive - Technological Disaster Risk Reduction

The Mutual Joint Visit Programme for Seveso Inspections

Seveso Plants Information Retrieval System

Major Accident Reporting System

European Union regulations by number
Regulation of chemicals